Charles Rodman Campbell (October 21, 1954 – May 27, 1994) was a convicted murderer who was executed by hanging in 1994 by the state of Washington.

Crimes
In December 1974, Campbell attacked 23-year-old Renae Wicklund while she was doing yard work outside her Clearview, Washington home. He demanded that she perform oral sex on him at knife point, threatening to kill her infant daughter, Shannah, if she did not comply. Wicklund submitted to his demands, and then called police after he left. Campbell was not apprehended until 1976, when she picked him out of a police line-up. Local law enforcement were not surprised, as they had been familiar with Campbell since his childhood.

At the subsequent trial, Wicklund and her neighbor, Barbara Hendrickson, testified in detail about the assault, and Campbell was sentenced to 40 years in prison for first-degree rape. Unknown to Wicklund, Campbell's sentences ran concurrently, not consecutively. This meant that he could in theory be paroled in seven years. Ultimately, Campbell ended up being released in 1981 for good behavior. His victims were not informed of his release. During the intervening years, Wicklund had separated from her husband, Jack, due to the lingering stress of the assault, and devoted herself to raising her daughter, supporting herself and Shannah with an in-home business as an accountant for local beauty parlors, as well as helping students obtain loans for beautician school.

Jack Wicklund meanwhile fell victim to a bizarre incident in December 1977, when he was found tied to a chair in his West Seattle home with massive third-degree burns. After receiving medical treatment, he said that a complete stranger visited his house, tied him up, doused him with gasoline, and set him on fire. Wicklund was forced to wear a rubber bodysuit to protect his damaged skin. Five months later, he died when his car crashed into a tree. The exact circumstances surrounding Jack Wicklund's death are unclear, and police never satisfactorily determined whether he had been murdered or had committed suicide.

On April 14, 1982, Barbara Hendrickson's husband, Don, walked over to Wicklund's house, and discovered Renae, her nine-year-old daughter Shannah and his wife, Barbara Hendrickson, all with their throats cut. Charles Campbell, then residing at a halfway house, was arrested the following week and charged with first-degree murder and second-degree theft (he had attempted to sell some of Renae Wicklund's jewelry only hours after the killings). Police described the crime scene as "resembling a massacre". Wicklund's body was naked, and she had been severely beaten, strangled, and raped with a blunt instrument in addition to having her throat slit (the murder weapon and the object used to rape her were never found). She was covered with bruises, and had a broken nose, jaw, and ribs, a testament to her attacker's aggression. Wicklund also had bruising on her knuckles, suggestive of defensive wounds. Barbara Hendrickson had been attacked and her throat cut after going over to the house to check on Wicklund, who had been ill with the flu that week. Shannah suffered the same fate when she came home from school. She had been choked, and her throat cut so deep that she was nearly decapitated. One of her earlobes was also torn, as the killer had made off with a pair of earrings she was wearing that day. The same day of the murders, Campbell also tried to rape another woman.

Police were told by a neighbor girl that she saw Campbell sneaking around Wicklund's yard with a knife that morning, and other neighbors observed him heading towards the house with a large blanket roll in his hands. It was also obvious that Campbell's getaway from the crime scene was extremely sloppy, with no attempt to conceal anything. A bloody hand print was found on a drinking glass in the Wicklunds' kitchen that matched his fingerprints, and a trail of Renae Wicklund's jewelry was running from the front door of the house down the walkway. Campbell's car had dried blood on the driver's side door handle, and the above-mentioned earring of Shannah's was found in the back seat. A pair of earrings belonging to Renae were found in Campbell's pants pockets when he was arrested. In addition, a fellow work-release resident directed police to a location along the banks of the Snohomish River, where he and Campbell had been on the evening of April 14. Divers retrieved more jewelry and knick-knacks taken from the Wicklund's home. When questioned by police, Hendrickson stated that "the man who'd attacked Renae eight years earlier" was the only possible perpetrator he could think of.

Campbell was arrested at the Monroe Reformatory on April 19, and charged with first degree murder. Held in the Snohomish County Jail, he was unpopular with other prisoners, since he had murdered a child, and because the circumstances of his crime meant that stricter rules would be imposed on the freedoms of inmates on parole.

Trial
At Campbell's November 1982 trial, he refused to testify in his defense, or discuss the murders at all. Testifying for the prosecution were neighbors who had seen him sneaking around the house on the afternoon of April 14, and his girlfriend Judy Dirks, who said that on the morning of the killings, he'd been at her home, where he consumed an entire six pack of beer. The next day, she noticed one of her kitchen knives was missing. Dirks testified that Campbell had "considerable resentment" towards Renae Wicklund and had driven past her home a couple of times while on work release. Campbell took the unusual step of cross-examining his girlfriend himself, and got her to admit that he had never told her he wanted to harm Renae Wicklund.

The defense did not call any witnesses or present any evidence other than that the case was a miscarriage of justice because investigators immediately focused on Campbell and did not search for any other potential suspects. Numerous citizens of Clearview had signed a petition demanding the death penalty for him, and the jury agreed, arguing that he showed no signs whatsoever of remorse for killing the Wicklunds and Barbara Hendrickson. During the trial, Campbell remained for the most part detached, and said little. Even the crime scene and autopsy photos (see below) did not arouse much noticeable emotion in him. Renae Wicklund's mother and sister, who lived in North Dakota, were particularly shocked by the murders because she had never told them about being raped eight years earlier.

During the trial, Campbell's attorneys argued that he could not be charged with rape, since the wound in Renae Wicklund's vagina was a post-mortem injury that had not bled. Snohomish County Coroner Dr. Clayton Haberman, who performed the autopsies, pointed out that brain death does not occur until a few minutes after circulation ceases, and she could technically have still been alive when the assault happened, but it may just as easily have been hours later. He also noted that Shannah lost so much blood that it was difficult to collect a sample from her. Judge Dennis Britt thus ordered the jury to disregard the rape allegations. The defense also protested the prosecution's decision to display graphic autopsy photos of the Wicklunds and Barbara Hendrickson. Judge Britt allowed this, but said that the jurors could decide for themselves whether they wanted to see their blood-splattered clothing.

Because the only living witness to the murders would not speak of or recount what happened, investigators had to roughly piece together the sequence of events on April 14. Renae Wicklund had obviously been attacked first. Shannah was found lying in the bedroom next to her, and it was believed that Campbell may have shown the girl her mother's lifeless body prior to slitting her throat. They were probably both dead by the time Barbara Hendrickson entered the home. Knocked-over furniture in the living room indicated that she could have run into Campbell and attempted to flee, but was caught. The bodies were all positioned in such a way that "the effect seems to have been to intentionally shock whoever came across them".

Incarceration and appeals
Campbell's prison record showed that he had not committed anything more than relatively minor offenses there, but one inmate, who was fearful of being labeled a prison snitch and so had his identity hidden, testified that he had terrorized fellow prisoners into submitting to sex and to get him drugs. Several guards at the Monroe Reformatory attested to being afraid of him as well, and had put in a request to have him transferred to the state penitentiary at Walla Walla, which ultimately went nowhere. Campbell's ex-wife told police that he went to her house and raped her on Christmas Day 1981 and on two subsequent occasions. Police told her that there was insufficient evidence to charge Campbell with anything.

Campbell's mother claimed that he had sex with a pet dog that he adopted, and after learning of his arrest for first-degree murder told investigators that, "It was inevitable. I never believed he was going to end up anywhere but the electric chair." His father and sisters could not be located. As a condition of his parole, he was also required to attend rape counseling sessions, but he ended up becoming romantically involved with his counselor, which led to the therapy being terminated (she became pregnant and gave birth to Campbell's second child). Campbell's mother did not live to see his execution.

In the aftermath of the trial, there were numerous lawsuits. His ex-wife sued the State of Washington for negligence in allowing him to go free on work release and rape her two times. Hilda Ahlers filed a lawsuit seeking damages for the same negligence that led to the death of her daughter and granddaughter. The state also agreed to pay Don Hendrickson $950,000 in damages.

In 1985, a still more damning report emerged alleging that Monroe Reformatory staff had not only covered up for Campbell, but were actively conspiring with him. Inmate counselor Roger Button kept certain inmates on his "payroll", which included Charles Campbell. The inmates supplied Button with sexual favors in exchange for his covering up their prison infractions; and in addition, he used them as extortion agents to beat up prisoners he disliked, collect debts, or protect prisoners he did like. Button denied all of these allegations.

The judge sentenced Campbell to death on December 17, 1984. By 1989, the case had gone through the entire state court system. Campbell's lawyers appealed his conviction and sentence for 12 years (a total of three appeals). The Washington Supreme Court affirmed the conviction and sentence.

The state offered inmates the choice of execution by lethal injection or hanging. If the inmate did not choose, execution would be by hanging. Campbell declined to choose how he would be executed, arguing that participating in the decision on how he would die was akin to his committing suicide, which Campbell's lawyers argued violated Washington public policy. While his case was at various stages of appeal, he remained a much-feared figure in Walla Walla's death row for the next decade, even spitting at then-Governor Booth Gardner when he peered into his cell.

On November 7, 1988, Campbell petitioned the U.S. Supreme Court to review his case. The Supreme Court denied his petition, but that did not end the appeals. There was now debate over whether hanging, fearing decapitation due to Campbell's obesity, was cruel and unusual punishment, and thus unconstitutional. This time, it was Washington State appealing to the Supreme Court in 1993, because the state wanted the case concluded, instead of dragging on for years. Campbell's repeated appeals showed that he would prefer to spend the rest of his life behind bars, rather than face execution.

Interviews with Campbell by prison psychologists concluded that he had "a near-total lack of empathy" for other human beings and felt that it was his right to live life and act however he pleased, and he also had the right to destroy anyone who angered him. He told them, "The world has created me, and I am free to do what I want. There is no right or wrong, or anyone to tell me what to do."

Execution 
On April 14, 1994, the United States Court of Appeals for the Ninth Circuit lifted the stay of execution. On May 3, 1994, Campbell asked the U.S. Supreme Court to put another stay on his execution, and to rule on his claim that hanging was unconstitutional, but his request went unanswered. His execution was set for May 27. Then-governor Mike Lowry was an opponent of the death penalty, but upon hearing the details of Campbell's crimes, he refused to commute his sentence to life in prison.

Twenty-four hours before the execution, Campbell was given his last shower. His last meal was served two hours before the hanging took place, and he refused to eat most of it. The family members of the victims asked to watch the execution, but this request was turned down.

Campbell spent his final hours talking to friends and relatives, including his ex-counselor and son. Campbell's was the second hanging in two years, after serial child killer Westley Allan Dodd. When the time for his execution arrived, Campbell refused to cooperate, and resorted to passive resistance, refusing to get up off the floor of his cell when instructed, finally having to be removed from his cell using pepper spray.

On the execution platform, Campbell refused to stand. Corrections officers had to forcefully strap him to a board. Campbell then repeatedly moved his head so that neither the cloak nor noose could be put on easily. It took prison officials 90 seconds to place a hood on his head, and to fix the noose before the trap was opened. The execution took place, and Campbell was pronounced dead about two minutes later. An autopsy confirmed that he had died of a fracture of the cervical spine, and that his death was quick.

Later, while cleaning out Campbell's holding cell, authorities found a four-inch piece of metal that he had been sharpening into a knife.

See also
 Capital punishment in Washington (state)
 Capital punishment in the United States
 List of people executed in Washington

References

General references
Washington Hangs Murderer; Texas Executes Officer-Killer May 28, 1994
Federal Court Upholds Execution by Hanging February 9, 1994
Inmate Faces 1st Hanging in U.S. Since 1965 March 27, 1989
The State of Washington, Respondent, v. Charles R. Campbell, Appellant.

External links
 Charles' son, Jacob Campbell's experiences regarding father

1954 births
1994 deaths
1982 murders in the United States
American murderers of children
American people executed for murder
American people convicted of rape
20th-century executions by Washington (state)
People executed by Washington (state) by hanging
People convicted of murder by Washington (state)
20th-century executions of American people
American male criminals
People from Hawaii